12017 may refer to:
12017, a minor planet without a naming citation
2017, a year of the Gregorian calendar, corresponding to 12017 in the Holocene calendar
Austerlitz, New York, United States (ZIP code)
Ayssènes, France (INSEE code)
Dehradun Shatabdi Express, an Indian Railways train which operates as train number 12017 from New Delhi to Dehradun
Robilante, Italy (postal code)